Edgar Glenn Harvey Emery (May 25, 1950 – August 6, 2021) was an American businessman, engineer, and politician who served as a member of the Missouri Senate, representing parts of southwestern Missouri.

Early life and education 
Emery was a native of Vernon County, Missouri, where his family was active in the feed and grain business. Emery earned a Bachelor of Science degree in engineering from the Missouri University of Science and Technology.

Career 
From 1981 to 1984, Emery worked as an executive at Texaco. He later worked as an engineering consultant.

Missouri House of Representatives 
Emery served as a member of the Missouri House of Representatives from 2003 to 2011, representing the 126th district. In 2007, Emery served as chair of the House Utilities Committee.

Missouri Senate 
Emery was first elected to the Missouri Senate in 2012 with 64% of the vote over Democrat Charles A. Burton. He was an unsuccessful candidate for the Senate in 2010. During the 2017 legislative session, Emery served as chair of the Senate Government Reform Committee and vice chair of the Senate Commerce, Consumer Protection, Energy and Environment Committee. During his final term in the Senate, Emery served as chair of the Governmental Accountability and Fiscal Oversight Committee.

2022 congressional campaign 
After incumbent Congresswoman Vicky Hartzler declared her candidacy for the 2022 United States Senate election in Missouri, Emery declared his candidacy for Missouri's 4th congressional district.

Political positions 
Emery opposed the expansion of Medicaid and the Affordable Care Act. He was a supporter of school choice, stating in 2016 that "when parents have choices, they get involved" and public schools focus on the "strength of the institution" instead of student achievement.

Personal life 
Emery and his wife, Rebecca, had four children. They lived in Lamar, Missouri. On August 3, 2021, Emery collapsed during a campaign event from what was described as a heart problem. He was hospitalized in Columbia, Missouri, and died there three days later, on August 6.

Electoral history

State representative

State senate

References

External links
 
 Campaign website
 Senate website

1950 births
2021 deaths
People from Nevada, Missouri
People from Lamar, Missouri
Republican Party Missouri state senators
Republican Party members of the Missouri House of Representatives
Businesspeople from Missouri
21st-century American politicians
Missouri University of Science and Technology alumni